Luxiaria amasa is a moth in the family Geometridae first described by Arthur Gardiner Butler in 1878. It is found from south-eastern Siberia to Korea, Japan, northern India, Nepal, Taiwan, Borneo, Sumatra, Java and Sulawesi.

The wingspan is 40–45 mm. Males have a pale yellow ground colour, with the border distal to the postmedial of both wings mottled broadly with rich brown.

Subspecies
Luxiaria amasa amasa
Luxiaria amasa noda Prout, 1928 (Sulawesi)
Luxiaria amasa perochrea Herbulot, 1993 (Sumatra)

References

Moths described in 1878
Ennominae
Moths of Japan